Hemigrammus pulcher is a semi-popular aquarium species, also known as the pretty tetra, garnet tetra or black wedge tetra. In the wild, the species is found near Iquitos in the Peruvian Amazon, and probably also in Brazil and Colombia.

In captivity
Breeding is difficult, as parents must be prevented from eating their own eggs, and require soft, acidic water. Eggs usually hatch within 20–24 hours. The tetra will accept most high quality flake foods. They do best in groups of 6 or more.

References

External links
Aquatic Community on care
Aquatic Community on breeding
Filaman.ifm-geomar.de
AquaArticles

Characidae
Fish of South America
Taxa named by Werner Ladiges
Fish described in 1938